One House Left Standing is the first album by English singer-songwriter Claire Hamill, released in 1972. She was just 17 when she recorded it. 

The album cover depicts Claire Hamill sitting on an old railway wheel in front of the Tees Transporter Bridge. The photograph was taken by Brian Cooke on the north side of the River Tees and was one of a series of photos featuring the bridge in the background.

Track listing 
All songs written by Claire Hamill and Mike Coles, except where noted.

 "Baseball Blues" (Claire Hamill) – 4:30
 "Man Who Cannot See Tomorrow's Sunshine" – 2:40
 "Consummation" – 2:15
 "River Song" – 4:30
 "Where Are Your Smiles At" – 2:20
 "When I Was a Child" (Hamill) – 2:11
 "Urge for Going" (Joni Mitchell) – 6:45
 "Flowers for Grandma" – 1:35
 "Phoenix" – 2:40
 "Smile Your Blues Away" (Hamill) – 2:15

Personnel 
 Claire Hamill – guitar, pipe organ, vocals
 Phil Bates – double bass
 Paul Buckmaster – cello, arrangements
 John Bundrick – keyboards
 Jack Emblow – accordion
 John Hawken – keyboards
 Aubrey Johnson – oboe
 Simon Kirke – drums
 David Lindley – guitar, mandolin
 John Martyn – guitar
 John Pigneguy – French horn
 Terry Reid – guitar, vocals
 Ray Warleigh – flute
 Tetsu Yamauchi – bass
 Richard Hewson - string arrangements
Technical
 John Burns - engineer, mixing
 Brian Cooke - cover photography

Reception 

The Allmusic review by Jo-Ann Greene awarded the album 4 stars and states "The entire set is carefully crafted, deftly arranged, and beautifully played, while Hamill shines throughout. The only complaint one can make is that she tries too much.".

References

External links
Claire Hamill's website

Claire Hamill albums
1972 debut albums
Albums arranged by Paul Buckmaster
Albums produced by Chris Blackwell
Island Records albums